Code page 951 is a code page number used for different purposes by IBM and Microsoft.

 IBM uses the code page number 951 for their double-byte PC Data KS code, the double byte component of their code page 949, an encoding for the Korean language. See Code page 949 (IBM).

 The code page number 951 was also used by Microsoft as part of a kludge for providing Hong Kong Supplementary Character Set (HKSCS-2001) support in Windows XP, in the file name of a replacement for code page 950 (Traditional Chinese) with Unicode mappings for some Extended User-defined Characters (EUDC) found in HKSCS. HKSCS characters without a Unicode mapping are assigned a Unicode Private Use Area (PUA) code point following previous practices. The IBM code page number for Big5 with HKSCS-2001 is 5471. See Hong Kong Supplementary Character Set § Microsoft Windows.

References

951
Encodings of Asian languages